Where Blood and Fire Bring Rest is the third full-length album released by metalcore band Zao on Solid State/Tooth & Nail. It was the first album to feature vocalist Dan Weyandt after the departure of Shawn Jonas along with new bassists/guitarists, Russ Cogdell and Brett Detar. The album contains a sample from the film The Shining at the end of "Lies of Serpents, A River of Tears", as well as a sample from the horror film The Prophecy during the intro to "Ravage Ritual". It is often considered among the greatest metalcore albums ever made.

Lyrical content
The lyrics on Blood & Fire deal with personal issues that vocalist Dan Weyandt was dealing with at the time they were written. The song "To Think Of You Is To Treasure An Absent Memory", deals with the suffering, and untimely deaths of Weyandt's friends and stepbrother. "Lies of Serpents" and "Ravage Ritual" both deal with hypocrisy in the Christian church.

Track listing

Personnel
Zao
Dan Weyandt – vocals
Russ Cogdell – guitar, bass
Jesse Smith – drums
Brett Detar – guitar, bass, piano
Production
Don Clark - Concept, Design, Layout Design
Dave Rankin - Artwork
Brandon Ebel - Executive Producer
Bruce Fitzhugh - Producer
Brian Gardner - Mastering
Jason Magnusson - Assistant Producer
Tim Owen - Photography
Barry Poynter - Engineer, Mixing

Album information
Record label (vinyl version): Broken Circles Records

References

Zao (American band) albums
1998 albums
Tooth & Nail Records albums
Solid State Records albums